Banī ʿAssela is a sub-district located in the Shar'ab as-Salam District, Taiz Governorate, Yemen. Banī ʿAssela had a population of 9,705 according to the 2004 census.

Villages
al-Kibash village.
Dufan village.
‘Unshūq village.
al-Shuraf village.
Ḥubol village.

References

Sub-districts in Shar'ab as-Salam District